Conversable is a SaaS based Artificial Intelligence (AI) powered conversational platform, headquartered in Austin, Texas. It allows customers to create intelligent, automated response flows through conversations in any messaging channel or voice platforms. It has offices in Austin and Dallas.

Some of companies using Conversable platform includes Budweiser, Wingstop, Pizza Hut, T.G.I. Friday's, Sam’s Club, Shake Shack, CES, Whole Foods and 7-Eleven.

History 
In 2015, Conversable Inc. was founded by Ben Lamm, founder and CEO of digital creative design studio Chaotic Moon Studios, which was acquired by Accenture, and Andrew Busey, former CEO & co-founder of social game company Challenge Games Inc., which was acquired by Zynga. It received funding of $2 million from angel investors.

In March 2017, Conversable launched a new product called AQUA (Answer Questions Using AI), which is a business intelligence (BI) platform.

In 2018, Conversable was acquired by LivePerson to "help LivePerson continue to accelerate its goal of providing conversational commerce products to customers," according to CEO Robert LoCascio.

Overview 
It helps companies to deliver on-demand content, customer self-service, and conversational commerce via messaging channel and voice applications.

Partnership 
The company is partnered with Phobio in January, 2018. It is also partnered with Olo, Hinduja Global Solutions, Booz Allen Hamilton, Ernst & Young, Mindtree, WPP and Pactera.

References

External links 
 Official website 

Internet properties established in 2015
AI companies
Computer-related introductions in 2015
Companies based in Austin, Texas
Companies based in Dallas
Instant messaging